Justice Waite may refer to:

 Morrison Waite, chief justice of the United States Supreme Court
 Aaron E. Waite, chief justice of the Oregon Supreme Court
 Charles P. Waite, justice of the Utah Supreme Court
 Henry Matson Waite (judge), chief justice of the Connecticut Supreme Court

See also
 William C. Wait, justice of the Massachusetts Supreme Judicial Court